Yaniella halotolerans is a Gram-negative, aerobic, halotolerant, non-spore-forming and non-motile bacterium from the genus Yaniella which has been isolated from saline soil from Xijiang, China.

References

External links
Type strain of Yaniella halotolerans at BacDive -  the Bacterial Diversity Metadatabase

Micrococcaceae
Bacteria described in 2004